Ronchis is a comune (municipality) in the Province of Udine in the Italian region Friuli-Venezia Giulia, located about  northwest of Trieste and about  southwest of Udine.

Ronchis borders the following municipalities: Latisana, Palazzolo dello Stella, Rivignano Teor, San Michele al Tagliamento, Varmo.

References

Cities and towns in Friuli-Venezia Giulia